OTI Festival, often known simply as La OTI, was an international song competition, organised annually between 1972 and 2000 by the Organización de Televisión Iberoamericana (OTI) (English: Iberoamerican Television Organisation), featuring participants representing primarily Ibero-American countries. Each participating OTI member broadcaster submitted an original song in Spanish or Portuguese to be performed on live television and transmitted to all OTI broadcasters via satellite. It was preceded by the Festival Mundial de la Canción Latina, held in 1969 and 1970 in Mexico.

The festival was an Ibero-American spin-off of the Eurovision Song Contest. The first edition was held at the Palacio de Exposiciones y Congresos auditorium in Madrid on November 25, 1972 and the last one was held on May 20, 2000 in Acapulco. Since then, it has been cancelled due to the questioning of the voting system of the latter contests, the lack of sponsors, the low quality of the entrants and the withdrawal of some of the most iconic countries such as Brazil, Colombia and Spain. 27 countries have participated at least once in the festival, with Chile, Panama, Peru, Puerto Rico and Venezuela participating in all 28 editions.

The main goal of the festival was to generate a process of cultural and artistic fellowship between the Spanish and Portuguese speaking countries. Although it was not as successful as the Eurovision Song Contest, it is its longest running and most successful spin-off to date, leaving a great mark in Latin America by giving many famous artists and hit songs.

Background 

Although the OTI contest was inspired in the Eurovision Song Contest, the festival was preceded by the Festival Mundial de la Canción Latina (English: Worldwide Latin Song Contest) which was held in Mexico DF in 1969 and 1970.

Participation 

The countries that were eligible to participate in the OTI festival needed to be active members of the Iberoamerican Television Organisation. The active members were those ones which belonged to the Organisation of Iberoamerican States. All songs are accompanied on stage by a symphony orchestra.

In order to take part in the event, the participating countries were required to be Spanish or Portuguese speaking countries, to have large communities of Spanish or Portuguese speakers within their territory such as the United States, or to have lingual or cultural ties with Latin American countries (As happened with the Netherlands Antilles). Apart from that, the entrant song needed to be performed in Spanish or Portuguese languages.

Both state financed and private broadcasters were able to join OTI as full members and in some cases different broadcasters collaborated during the airing of the event as did the Venezuelan broadcasters Venevision and RCTV.

History 
The OTI Song Contest was held for first time on November 25, 1972 in the Congress Palace of Madrid. 13 countries took part in the first edition of the event. Spain, Colombia, Brazil, Venezuela, Panama, Portugal, Bolivia, Chile, Peru, Uruguay, Argentina, Dominican Republic and Puerto Rico  were the debuting countries.

After the first show, the rest of the Latin American countries progressively started taking part in the event. The festival expanded even further away from the traditional Latin American sphere, to the point that even the United States and the Netherlands Antilles took part in the event. In 1992 the festival reached its record of 25 participating countries.

Mexico and Spain were the most successful countries in the history of the competition with 6 victories each while Argentina won the contest 4 times. Brazil was the fourth most successful country with three victories.

Hosting 

The location of the festival was decided following various criteria. At first it was decided that the winning country would organise and celebrate the contest the next year, but after the victory of Nicaragua in 1977, the country could not host the contest due to the bloody civil war that broke out the next year.  In those years, many Latin American countries suffered from political and economical instability. For that reason, from that year on, the host city was decided by an annual draw organised by the Iberoamerican Television Organisation. 

Spain and Mexico were the countries that hosted the contest more times with 6 editions each one. In total, 13 countries of the 25 that participated in the song contest served as host locations.

Venues and presenters 

§ Indicates that the orchestra was specially arranged for this edition of the contest.

There was no OTI Song Contest in 1999 due to floods in the host city. The competition was cancelled in 2001 and beyond.

Voting system 
The voting system to decide the winner of the contest changed over the years. At first, the winner was decided telephonically by five national juries from every participating country. Each jury member voted only for their favorite song and the winner was the song which had more points at the end of the process. In 1977 the number of national jurors per country was changed to three due to the increase of the number of participating countries and to the resultingly much longer show.

From 1982 on, the winner was decided by a professional room jury composed by famous music personalities. One year later, the voting system was changed again in a way that the voting process was secret. Since that year, only the three most voted countries were revealed at the end of the show which often generated scandals and controversies.

Winners

By country

Legacy
Although the OTI Song Contest has not been celebrated since 2000, the festival is still widely remembered in many countries, especially in Mexico, where the festival was always well received by the audience, even when the popularity of the festival was declining.

The contest was enormously popular in Mexico thanks to the "National OTI contest", which was the national final to select the Mexican entrant for the international, and main OTI Contest. Many famous singers such as Juan Gabriel, Luis Miguel, Lucero, or the girl band Pandora, tried to represent their country in the OTI festival, but they didn't win the national contest.

In Spain, many popular names took part in the OTI Contest including the band Trigo Limpio, that represented the country in 1977 with the Song "Rómpeme, mátame" (English: Break Me, Kill Me) before representing Spain in the Eurovision Song Contest in 1980. Many Years later in 1995 Marcos Llunas won the contest two years before representing Spain in Eurovision in 1997. Other popular Spanish OTI contestants are Marisol, and Camilo Sesto.

At least one Eurovision winner has participated in the OTI: Dave Benton, who sang for Netherlands Antilles in 1981, later won the Eurovision Song Contest 2001 for Estonia, performing the song "Everybody" with Tanel Padar and 2XL.

Return attempts 
As the mark of the OTI Festival in Latin America is still big, some organisations of diverse nature have tried to revive the festival. Some Mexican artists also made public their support to a return to the screens of the OTI Festival.

In March 2011, it was announced by some online newspapers that Televisa, the national Mexican TV channel was preparing for the relaunch of the event in two stages, the first one, was to revive the "National OTI Contest", the Mexican national final, while the second one would be to revive the international and main OTI Festival. The aim of this attempt to bring to life the festival was to give the opportunity to young performers to show their talent. The festival at the end never took place, but it was neither cancelled.

In June 2016, it was announced the relaunch of OTI as a media organisation. The broadcasting union was renamed as "Organización de Telecomunicaciones de Iberoamerica" (Iberoamerican Telecommunications Organisation) the organisation evolved from being a television contents exchange platform to include members of a broader nature such as newspapers and telephone-internet companies apart from TV and radio channels. This relaunch instantaneously sparked rumors about a possible relaunch of the festival that were later denied.

In 2017 it was announced the start of an organisation called "Organización de Talento Independiente" (Independent Talent Organisation) which in Spanish casually coincides with the acronym "OTI". The main goal of the organisation was to try to recreate the festival between Mexican singers and artists from the Latin community of USA. Although the festival was not a competition between broadcasters of different participating countries, the competition was held in the Mexican city of Puerto Peñasco in the Sonora State.

In February 2022, RTVE announced Hispavision, a song festival where Spanish-speaking Latin American countries will take part alongside Brazil and Portugal as invited nations. The project is scheduled to start in 2023 and will be held in Cartagena, Colombia.

In July 12, 2022, the European Broadcasting Union (EBU) announced its expansion of the Eurovision Song Contest brand to Latin America. The planned contest will be produced by the same producers of other Eurovision spin-offs, including the American Song Contest and the upcoming Eurovision Song Contest Canada. They have begun searching for a viable host city.

References

External links 

 Organización de Televisión Iberoamericana Website

 
Singing competitions
Songwriting competitions
Music festivals established in 1972
2000 disestablishments
Defunct music festivals
Latin music awards